The Irvingtonian North American Land Mammal Age on the geologic timescale is the North American  faunal stage according to the North American Land Mammal Ages chronology (NALMA), spanning from 1.9 million – 250,000 years BP. Named after an assemblage of fossils from the Irvington District of Fremont, California, the Irvingtonian is usually considered to overlap the Lower Pleistocene and Middle Pleistocene epochs. The Irvingtonian is preceded by the Blancan and followed by the Rancholabrean NALMA stages.

The Irvingtonian can be further divided into substages: 
Irvingtonian I - approximately 1.9 MA TO 0.85 MA
Irvingtonian II - approximately 0.85 MA TO 0.4 MA
Irvingtonian III - approximately 0.4 MA TO 0.25 MA

The beginning of the Irvingtonian is defined by the first appearance of Mammuthus south of 55° N in North America, and the beginning of the succeeding Rancholabrean is defined by the first appearance of Bison.

In South America, it chronologically overlaps with the Uquian (partial), Ensenadan, and Lujanian in South American Land Mammal Ages.

Fauna
Notable mammals
Artiodactyla - even-toed ungulates
 Platygonus, peccaries
 Titanotylopus, camels
Carnivora - carnivores
 Borophagus, bone-crushing dogs
 Canis, wolves
 Chasmaporthetes, hyenas
Hesperocyoninae, dog-like carnivores
Machairodontinae, saber-toothed cats
Lynx, lynxes, bobcats
Ursus, bears
Lagomorpha - lagomorphs
 Hypolagus, rabbits
Perissodactyla - odd-toed ungulates
 Nannippus, horses
 Plesippus, horses - may belong in Equus
Proboscidea - elephants
Elephantidae, mammoths
Mammutidae, mastodons
 Rhynchotherium, gomphotheres
 Stegomastodon, gomphotheres
Rodentia - rodents
 Paenemarmota, giant marmots

Notable birds
Charadriiformes
 unknown scolopacid (archaic calidrid or turnstone?)
Falconiformes - diurnal raptors
 Falco sp., a falcon
Passeriformes
 unknown corvid (archaic magpie?)

References

 
Pleistocene life
Calabrian (stage)
Middle Pleistocene
Pleistocene animals of North America
Pleistocene California